Red Hat Tower is the headquarters of Red Hat. It is located at Raleigh, North Carolina. It is owned by J.P. Morgan Trust Co.

In 1999, Carolina Power & Light announced plans for a new headquarters tower. The 2000 merger with Florida Progress Corporation which created Progress Energy increased the need for the new building, which at the time had an estimated cost of $60 million. On February 14, 2002, Progress announced that the new project, costing $80 million, would include retail and residential space as well as offices, with a completion date of 2004. The company bought the two-acre site east of the existing headquarters in 2000. In April 2002, Progress selected Carter & Associates of Atlanta to develop the project. The  first phase would be complete in 2004, with the  second phase to follow in 2006. Late in 2002, Progress Energy announced its two new office buildings would be built at the same time. Instead, with commercial construction in a slump, Progress planned to speed up the larger project, which would bring together employees from a number of locations, including One Hannover Square, 333 Corporate Plaza and One Exchange Plaza in downtown Raleigh.

On September 2, 2004, the building officially opened with a ribbon-cutting ceremony.

The January 2011 announcement that Progress will merge with Duke Energy left the status of Two Progress Plaza in question, since completion of the merger would likely mean the company needs less space. However, on August 25, 2011, Red Hat announced plans to move 600 employees from its offices on the N.C. State Centennial Campus. A ribbon cutting ceremony was held June 24, 2013 in the re-branded Red Hat Headquarters.

Gallery

References

External links
 

2004 establishments in North Carolina
Buildings and structures completed in 2004
Information technology company headquarters in the United States
Red Hat
Skyscraper office buildings in Raleigh, North Carolina